Juan Pablo Castro (born 20 April 1999) is an Argentine rugby union player who plays for the Jaguares. On 21 November 2019, he was named in the Jaguares squad for the 2020 Super Rugby season. His playing position is Centre.

References

External links
 itsrugby Profile

Jaguares (Super Rugby) players
Rugby union centres
Argentine rugby union players
1999 births
Living people
Dogos XV players
ASM Clermont Auvergne players
People from San Juan, Argentina
Sportspeople from San Juan Province, Argentina
Pampas XV players